The Uruguay men's national field hockey team represents Uruguay in men's international field hockey competitions. It is controlled by the Uruguayan Field Hockey Federation.

Tournament record

Pan American Cup
2004 – 9th place
2009 – 8th place
2013 – 8th place

South American Games
 2006 – 4th place
 2014 – 5th place
 2018 – 6th place
 2022 – 5th place

South American Championship
2003 – 4th place
2008 – 
2010 – 
2013 – 5th place
2016 –

Pan American Challenge
2011 – 
2015 –

Hockey World League
2016–17 – Round 1

FIH Hockey Series
2018–19 – First round

See also
Uruguay women's national field hockey team

References

External links
Official website
FIH profile

Americas men's national field hockey teams
National team
Field hockey